The 1920–21 season was the twenty-sixth season in which Dundee competed at a Scottish national level, playing in Division One. They would finish in 4th place for the second consecutive season. Dundee would also compete in the Scottish Cup, where they were knocked out in the Quarter-finals by Albion Rovers.

Scottish Division One 

Statistics provided by Dee Archive.

League table

Scottish Cup 

Statistics provided by Dee Archive.

Player Statistics 
Statistics provided by Dee Archive

|}

See also 

 List of Dundee F.C. seasons

References

External links 

 1919-20 Dundee season on Fitbastats

Dundee F.C. seasons
Dundee